Kwon Yong-gwang ( or  ; born 14 January 1996) is a North Korean weightlifter who competes in the -69 kg division. In 2016 he won a bronze medal at the Asian Championships and placed 13th at the Rio Olympics.

References

1996 births
Living people
Olympic weightlifters of North Korea
Weightlifters at the 2016 Summer Olympics
North Korean male weightlifters
20th-century North Korean people
21st-century North Korean people